The U7 small nuclear RNA (U7 snRNA) is an RNA molecule and a component of the small nuclear ribonucleoprotein complex (U7 snRNP). The U7 snRNA is required for histone pre-mRNA processing.

The 5' end of the U7 snRNA binds the HDE (histone downstream element), a conserved purine-rich region, located 15 nucleotides downstream the histone mRNA cleavage site.  The binding of the HDE region by the U7 snRNA, through complementary base-pairing, is an important step for the future recruitment of cleavage factors during histone pre-mRNA processing.

See also
Duchenne muscular dystrophy
Histone 3' UTR stem-loop
LSM10

References

Further reading

External links
 
 The uRNA database

RNA splicing
Small nuclear RNA
Spliceosome